The Justin Lee rape scandal involves a Taiwanese man, Justin Lee, who was convicted of nine rapes, during which he had drugged women and then recorded the sexual assaults.

Lee is the son of former Yuanta Financial Holding Co board member Lee Yueh-tsang, and known for his presence at fashion parties and nightclubs. In 2011, two sisters filed a police report against Lee. During the investigation, the police discovered recorded files on Lee's computer and arrested him in November 2012. Prosecutors said that since August 2009, Lee had been drugging women or getting them drunk in luxury nightclubs around Taiwan, before taking them to his home to rape them while they were unconscious. Lee fled Taipei and was on the run for 23 days before turning himself in.

On 2 September 2014, following an appeal, Lee's sentence was increased to 80 years' jail for his offences. However, he would only have to serve 30 years as that was the maximum punishment for those charges by law. He was also ordered to pay  compensation to victims.

References

rape in Asia
rape in the 2000s
rape in the 2010s
Crime in Taiwan
Violence against women in Taiwan